This list of the Mesozoic life of New Jersey contains the various prehistoric life-forms whose fossilized remains have been reported from within the US state of New Jersey and are between 252.17 and 66 million years of age.

A

 †Abietineaepollenites
 †Abietineaepollenites aequalis
 †Abietineaepollenites microalatus – or unidentified comparable form
 †Abietineaepollenites microreticulatus
 †Abietineaepollenites microsaccus
 †Acanthichnus
  Acipenser
 Acteon
 †Acutostrea
 †Acutostrea plumosa
 †Adocus – type locality for genus
 †Adocus agilis – type locality for species
  †Adocus beatus – type locality for species
 †Adocus firmus – type locality for species
 †Adocus microglypha – type locality for species
 †Adocus parvus
 †Adocus pravus – type locality for species
 †Adocus striatula – type locality for species
 †Adocus syntheticus – type locality for species
 †Aenona
 †Aenona eufaulensis
 †Aequitriradites
 †Aequitriradites insolitus – type locality for species
 †Aequitriradites spinulosus
  †Agerostrea
 †Agerostrea mesenterica
 †Agerostrea monmouthensis
 †Agerostrea nasuta
 †Agerostrea ungulata
 †Agomphus
 †Agomphus pectoralis – type locality for species
 †Agorostrea
 †Agorostrea falcata
 †Agorostrea mesenterica
 †Agraylea
 †Agraylea cretaria – type locality for species
 †Agraylea lentiginosa – type locality for species
 †Agraylea parva – type locality for species
 †Alautunmyia – type locality for genus
 †Alautunmyia elongata – type locality for species
 †Aliofusus
 †Aliofusus sayri
 †Alisporites
 †Alisporites thomasii – or unidentified comparable form
   †Allognathosuchus – or unidentified related form
 †Amaurellina
 †Amaurellina stephensoni
  Amauropsis
 †Amauropsis cadwaladeri
 †Ambermantis – type locality for genus
 †Ambermantis wozniaki – type locality for species
 †Ambigostrea
 †Ambigostrea tecticosta
 †Ambonicardia
 †Ambonicardia cookii
 †Ameghinichnus
 †Amerogenia – type locality for genus
 †Amerogenia macrops – type locality for species
 Amia
 †Amia fragosa – or unidentified comparable form
  †Amyda
 †Amyda prisca – type locality for species
 †Anatalavis
 †Anatalavis rex – type locality for species
 †Anatimya
 †Anatimya anteradiata
 †Anatimya lata
 †Anchisauripus
 †Anchisauripus minusculum
 †Anchisauripus parallelus
 †Anchisauripus sillimani
 †Anchisauripus tuberosus
 †Anchura
 †Anchura abrupta
 †Anchura bakeri
 †Anchura pennata
 †Anchura raritanensis
 †Anchura rostrata
 †Anisomyon
 †Ankylosaurus
  †Anomia
 †Anomia argentaria
 †Anomia tellinoides – tentative report
 †Anomoedus
 †Anomoedus phaseolus
 †Anomoeodus
 †Anomoeodus phaseolus
   †Anomoepus
 †Anomoepus crassus – type locality for species
 †Anomoepus intermedius
 †Anomoepus scambus
 †Apatopus
 †Apatopus lineatus
 †Aphrodina
 †Aphrodina cretacea
 †Aphrodina eufaulensis
 †Aphrodina johnsoni
 †Apoglaesoconis – type locality for genus
 †Apoglaesoconis ackermani – type locality for species
 †Apoglaesoconis cherylae – type locality for species
 †Apoglaesoconis luzzii – type locality for species
 †Apoglaesoconis swolenskyi – type locality for species
 Appendicisporites
 †Appendicisporites ethmos – or unidentified comparable form
 †Appendicisporites multicornutus – type locality for species
 †Appendicisporites tricornitatus
 †Arambourgiania – or unidentified comparable form
 †Araucariacites
 †Araucariacites australis
 Arca
 †Arca enfaulensis
 †Arca saffordi
 †Arcellites
 †Arcellites caudatus – type locality for species
 †Arcellites mirabilis – type locality for species
 †Arcellites nudus
 †Archaeostephanus – type locality for genus
 †Archaeostephanus corae – type locality for species
 †Archaeromma
 †Archaeromma carnifex – type locality for species
 †Archaeserropalpus – type locality for genus
 †Archaeserropalpus cretaceus – type locality for species
 †Archichrysotus
 †Archichrysotus incompletus – type locality for species
 †Archicnephia – type locality for genus
 †Archicnephia ornithoraptor – type locality for species
 †Archimelzira – type locality for genus
 †Archimelzira americana – type locality for species
 †Archiphora – type locality for genus
 †Archiphora pria – type locality for species
 †Argoides
 †Argoides macrodactylus
 †Arroges
 †Arroges rostrata
 †Ascaulocardium
 †Ascaulocardium armatum
  Astarte
 †Astarte annosa
 †Astarte crenulirata
 †Astarte octolirata
 †Astarte parilis
 †Astarte veta
  Astrangia
 †Astrangia cretacea
 Ataphrus
   Atractosteus
 †Atreipus
 †Atreipus milfordensis – type locality for species
 Attagenus
 †Attagenus turonianensis – type locality for species
 †Aureophlebia – type locality for genus
 †Aureophlebia sinitshenkovae – type locality for species
 †Avellana
 †Avellana bullata
 †Avellana pelagana
 †Avellana raritana
 †Axonoceras
 †Axonoceras angolanum – or unidentified comparable form

B

 †Baculites
 †Baculites claviformis
 †Baculites haresi
 †Baculites ovatus
 †Baculites scotti – tentative report
 †Baculites vaalsensis
  †Baikuris
 †Baikuris casei – type locality for species
 †Balmeisporites
 †Balmeisporites glenelgensis
 †Balmeisporites holodictyus
 Barbatia
 †Barbatia uniopsis
 †Batrachopus
 †Batrachopus gracilis
  †Belemnitella
 †Belemnitella americana
 †Bellifusus
 †Bellifusus curvicostatus
 Bernaya
 †Bernaya burlingtonensis – type locality for species
 †Boodlepteris
 †Boodlepteris turoniana
 †Boreobythus – type locality for genus
 †Boreobythus turonius – type locality for species
 †Borephemera – type locality for genus
 †Borephemera goldmani – type locality for species
 †Bothremys
 †Bothremys cooki – type locality for species
 †Bottosaurus
 †Bottosaurus harlani – type locality for species
 Botula
 †Botula ripleyana
  Brachaelurus
 †Brachaelurus hornerstownensis – type locality for species
  †Brachychampsa – or unidentified comparable form
 †Brachychirotherium
 †Brachyrhizodus
 †Brachyrhizodus wichitaensis
 †Brontozoum
 †Brontozoum approximatum
 †Brontozoum giganteum
 †Brontozoum sillimanium
  †Brownimecia – type locality for genus
 †Brownimecia clavata – type locality for species

C

 Caestocorbula
 †Caestocorbula crassaplica
 †Caestocorbula crassiplica
 †Caestocorbula percompressa
 †Callialasporites
 †Callialasporites insuetus – type locality for species
 Callianassa
 †Callianassa mortoni
 †Calliomphalus
 †Calliomphalus americanus
 †Calliomphalus microcancelli
 †Camarozonosporites
 †Camarozonosporites rudis
 †Camptonectes
 †Camptonectes argillensis
 †Camptonectes bellisculptus
 †Camptonectes bubonis
 †Camptonectes burlingtonensis
 †Camptonectes parvus
 †Caprotina
 †Caprotina jerseyensis
 †Cardiaster
 †Cardiaster smocki
 Cardita
 †Cardita subquadrata
 
 †Cardium enfaulense
 †Cardium raritanensis
 †Cardium sayri
 †Carinatermes – type locality for genus
 †Carinatermes nascimbeni – type locality for species
 †Carios
 †Carios jerseyi
 †Casstrochaena
 †Casstrochaena whitfieldi
 Catapleura
 †Catapleura ponderosa – type locality for species
 †Catapleura repanda – type locality for species
 †Catopygus
 †Catopygus pusillus
 †Catopygus williamsi
 †Cenomanocarcinus
 †Cenomanocarcinus robertsi
  †Ceratodus
 †Ceratodus frazieri – or unidentified related form
  Cerithium
 †Cerithium pilsbryi
 †Cerithium weeksi – or unidentified related form
 †Chasmatosporites
 †Chasmatosporites rimatus
 †Chedighaii
 †Chedighaii barberi
 Cheilotrichia
 †Cheilotrichia cretacea – type locality for species
 †Chelone
 †Chelone sopita
  Chiloscyllium
  †Chirotherium
 †Chirotherium lulli – type locality for species
 †Chirotherium parvum – type locality for species
 Chlamys
 †Chlamys michellesmithi – type locality for species
 †Chlamys whitfieldi
 †Chloranthistemon
 †Chloranthistemon crossmanensis – type locality for species
 †Choriatothyris
 †Choriatothyris plicata
 †Choristothyris
 †Choristothyris plicata
 †Choristothyris vanuxemi
 †Cicatricosisporites
 †Cicatricosisporites goeppertii
 †Cicatricosisporites intersectus
 †Cicatricosisporites striosporites
 †Cicatricosisporites verrucosus – type locality for species
 †Cidares
 †Cidares armigera
  †Cimoliasaurus
 †Cimoliasaurus magnus
  †Cimolomys – or unidentified comparable form
 †Cimolomys clarki
 †Cingulatisporites
 †Cingulatisporites carinatus – type locality for species
 †Cingulatisporites exiniconfertus – type locality for species
 †Cingulatisporites problematicus
 †Cingulatisporites pyriformis – type locality for species
 †Cirroceras
 †Cirroceras conradi
 †Clathropteris
 †Clathropteris meniscoides
 Clavagella
 †Clavagella armata
 †Clavatipollenites
 †Clavatipollenites couperi
 †Clavatipollenites hughesii
 †Clavipholas
 †Clavipholas pectorosa
  †Clidastes
 †Clidastes iguanavus – type locality for species
 Cliona
 †Cliona aretacica
 †Cliona cretacea
 †Cliona cretacica
 †Cliona microtuberum
 †Cliona microtuberus
 †Clionia
 †Clionia cretacica
 †Clisocolus
 †Clisocolus umbonata
 †Cloranthistemon
 †Cloranthistemon crossmanensis
  †Coelosaurus
 †Coelosaurus antiquus – type locality for species
 †Coelurosaurichnus
 Concavisporites
 †Concavisporites granulatus – type locality for species
 †Concavisporites orbicornutus – type locality for species
 †Concavisporites tricornutus – type locality for species
 †Conclavipollis
 †Conclavipollis densilatus – type locality for species
 †Conosaurops
 †Conosaurops bowmani
 †Contogenys – tentative report
  Corbula
 †Corbula crassiplicata
 †Corbula emacerata
 †Corbula foulkei
 †Corbula greywaczi
 †Corbula manleyi
 †Corbula manleyi duplex
 †Corbula subcompressa
 †Corbula swedesboroensis
 †Corsochelys
 Crassatella
 †Crassatella lintea
 †Crassatella transversus
 †Crassatella vadosa
  Crassostrea
 †Crassostrea tecticosta
 †Cratotabanus
 †Cratotabanus newjerseyensis – type locality for species
 †Crenella
 †Crenella elegantula
 †Crenella serica
 †Cretagaster – type locality for genus
 †Cretagaster raritanensis – type locality for species
 †Cretocar – type locality for genus
 †Cretocar luzzii – type locality for species
 †Cretocoranina
 †Cretodus
 †Cretodus arcuata
 †Cretodus borodini
  †Cretolamna
 †Cretolamna appendiculata
 †Cretolamna arcuata
 †Cretomicrophorus
 †Cretomicrophorus novemundus – type locality for species
 †Cretomitarcys – type locality for genus
 †Cretomitarcys luzzii – type locality for species
 †Cretothrips – type locality for genus
 †Cretothrips antiquus – type locality for species
 †Cretotrigona
 †Cretotrigona prisca – type locality for species
  †Cretoxyrhina
 †Cretoxyrhina mantelli
 †Crocodilus
 †Crocodilus obscurus – type locality for species
 †Cronquistiflora
 †Cronquistiflora sayrevillensis
 Ctena
 †Ctena parvilineata
 Ctenoides
 †Ctenoides crenulicostata
  Cucullaea
 †Cucullaea antroea
 †Cucullaea antrosa
 †Cucullaea capax
 †Cucullaea littlei
 †Cucullaea neglecta
 †Cucullaea vulgaris
  Culicoides
 †Culicoides bifidus – type locality for species
 †Culicoides casei
 †Culicoides filipalpis
 †Culicoides grandibocus – type locality for species
 †Culicoides truncatus – type locality for species
 †Culicoides yoosti – type locality for species
 †Cuna
 †Cuna texana
 †Cuneocorbula – tentative report
 †Cuneocorbula whitfieldi
 Cuspidaria
 †Cuspidaria jerseyensis
 †Cuspidaria ventricosa
 †Cyathidites
 †Cyathidites australis
 †Cyathidites minor
 †Cycadopites
 †Cycadopites folicularis – or unidentified comparable form
 †Cylindracanthus
 †Cylindracanthus rectus
 †Cymbophora
 †Cymbophora appressa
 †Cymbophora berryi
 †Cymbophora lintea
 †Cymbophora wordeni
 †Cymella
 †Cymella bella
 †Cymella bellatexana
 †Cyprimeria
 †Cyprimeria densata
 †Cyprimeria excavata
 †Cyrodes
 Cyzicus – or unidentified comparable form

D

 †Dacrycarpites
 †Dacrycarpites dacrydioides
  Dasyatis
 †Dasyatis newegyptensis – type locality for species
  †Deinosuchus
 †Deinosuchus rugosus
 †Deltoidospora
 †Deltoidospora incomposita – type locality for species
 †Densoisporites
 †Densoisporites perinatus
 †Dentalium
 †Dentalium enfaulensis
 †Dentalium leve
 †Dentalium subarcuatum
 †Detrusandra
 †Detrusandra mystagoga
 †Dhondtichlamys
 †Dhondtichlamys venustus
 †Dianchora
 †Dianchora echinata
 †Dictyophyllidites
 †Dictyophyllidites harrisii
  †Didelphodon – or unidentified comparable form
 †Didymoceras
 †Didymoceras draconis – or unidentified comparable form
 †Diploconcha
 †Diploconcha cretacea
  †Diplocynodon
 †Diplurus – or unidentified comparable form
 †Diplurus longicaudatus
 †Dipristis
 †Dipristis meirsii – type locality for species
 †Discisporites
 †Discisporites discoides – type locality for species
  †Discoscaphites
 †Discoscaphites conradi
 †Discoscaphites gulosus
 †Dithophaga
 †Dithophaga carolinensis
 Dohrniphora
 †Dolicholatirus
 Dosinia
 †Dosinia depressa
 †Dosinia haddonfieldensis
 †Drilluta
 †Drilluta buboanus – or unidentified comparable form
  †Dryptosaurus – type locality for genus
 †Dryptosaurus aquilunguis – type locality for species
 †Dziedzickia
 †Dziedzickia nashi – type locality for species

E

 †Echodus
 †Echodus ferox
 †Ectrepesthoneura
 †Ectrepesthoneura swolenskyi – type locality for species
 †Edaphadon
 †Edaphadon mirificus
 Edaphodon
 †Edaphodon mirificus
  †Edmontosaurus
 †Edmontosaurus minor
 †Elasmophron – type locality for genus
 †Elasmophron kurthi – type locality for species
  †Elasmosaurus
 †Elasmosaurus orientalis – type locality for species
 †Electrobaissa – type locality for genus
 †Electrobaissa omega – type locality for species
 †Electrosania – type locality for genus
 †Electrosania cretica – type locality for species
 †Ellipsoscapha
 †Ellipsoscapha mortoni
 †Emplita – type locality for genus
 †Emplita casei – type locality for species
  †Enchodus
 †Enchodus ferox
 †Enchodus gladiolus
 †Endoptygma
 †Endoptygma leprosa
 †Eomatsucoccus
 †Eomatsucoccus casei – type locality for species
 Eonavicula
 †Eonavicula rostellata
  †Epitonium
 †Epitonium sillimani
 †Erquelinnesia
 †Erquelinnesia molaria – type locality for species
 †Etea
 †Eubaculites
 †Eubaculites carinatus
 †Eubaculites labyrinthicus – or unidentified comparable form
 †Eufistulana
 †Eufistulana whitfieldi
 †Euspira
 †Euspira halli
 †Euspira rectilabrum
  †Eutrephoceras
 †Eutrephoceras dekayi
  †Exogyra
 †Exogyra cancellata
 †Exogyra costata
 †Exogyra ponderosa
 †Eydeia
 †Eydeia jerseyensis – type locality for species

F

 Fasciolaria

G

 †Gegania
 †Gervilia
 †Gervilia ensiformis
  †Gervillia
 †Gervillia minima
 †Gervilliopsis
 †Gervilliopsis ensiformis
  Ginglymostoma
 †Ginglymostoma cuspidata – type locality for species
 †Ginglymostoma globidens
 †Glaesoconis
 †Glaesoconis nearctica – type locality for species
 †Gleicheniidites
 †Gleicheniidites orientalis
 †Gleicheniidites raritanianus – type locality for species
 †Gleicheniidites senonicus
 Glossus
 Glycimeris
 †Glycimeris mortoni
  Glycymeris
 †Glycymeris compressa
 †Glycymeris mortoni
 †Glycymeris rotundata
 †Glyptoxoceras
 †Glyptoxoceras aquisgranense
 †Gonyaulax
 †Gonyaulax pachyderma – or unidentified comparable form
 †Gonyaulax wetzeli – or unidentified comparable form
 †Graculavus – type locality for genus
 †Graculavus pumilis – type locality for species
 †Graculavus velox – type locality for species
  †Grallator
 †Grallator cursorius
 †Grallator formosus
 †Grallator parallelus
 †Grallator sulcatus – type locality for species
 †Granocardium
 †Granocardium dumosum
 †Granocardium kuemmeli
 †Granocardium kummeli
 †Granocardium tenuistriatum
 †Granocardium trilineatum
 †Gregikia – type locality for genus
 †Gregikia pallida – type locality for species
 †Grimaldiella – type locality for genus
 †Grimaldiella gregaria – type locality for species
 †Grimaldiella resinophila – type locality for species
 †Grimaldiraphidia
 †Grimaldiraphidia luzzii – type locality for species
 †Grimaldivania – type locality for genus
 †Grimaldivania ackermani – type locality for species
 †Grimaldivania mckimorum – type locality for species
  †Gryphaea
 †Gryphaea convexa
 †Gryphaea mutabilis
 †Gryphaeostrea
 †Gryphaeostrea vomer
 †Gwyneddichnium
 †Gwyneddichnium majore
 †Gwyneddichnium minor
 Gyrodes
 †Gyrodes abyssinus
 †Gyrodes petrosus
 †Gyrodes supraplicatus

H

  †Hadrosaurus – type locality for genus
 †Hadrosaurus cavatus – type locality for species
 †Hadrosaurus foulkii – type locality for species
 †Hadrosaurus minor – type locality for species
  †Halisaurus
 †Halisaurus platyspondylus
 †Hamule
 †Hamule falcatus
 †Hamule squamosus
 †Haptosphenus – or unidentified comparable form
 †Hardouinea
 †Hardouinea mortonisemmonsi
 †Harpagopus
 †Harpagopus dubius
 †Heleageron
 †Heleageron grimaldii – type locality for species
 Hemiaster
 †Hemiaster kuemmeli
 †Hemiaster welleri
 Hemiscyllium
 †Henopelecinus – type locality for genus
 †Henopelecinus pygmaeus – type locality for species
 †Hercorhynchus
 †Hercorhyncus
 †Hercorhyncus pagodaformis
 †Herpystezoum
 †Herpystezoum magnus
 †Herpystezoum marshi
 †Herpystezoum minutus
  Heterodontus
 †Heterodontus creamridgensis – type locality for species
 †Hilarimorphites – type locality for genus
 †Hilarimorphites longimedia – type locality for species
 †Hilarimorphites setosa – type locality for species
 †Hilarimorphites superba – type locality for species
 †Hilarimorphites yeatesi – type locality for species
 †Homorophus – type locality for genus
 †Homorophus insuetus – type locality for species
  †Hoploparia
 †Hoploparia gabbi
 †Hoploparia gladiator
  †Hoploscaphites
 †Hoploscaphites pumilus
  †Hybodus
 †Hyposaurus
 †Hyposaurus rogersii – type locality for species
 †Hypotodus
 †Hypotodus aculeatus
 †Hypoxytoma
 †Hypoxytoma abrupta
 †Hypsibema
 †Hypsibema crassicauda
  †Hypsognathus – type locality for genus
 †Hypsognathus fenneri – type locality for species
  †Hypuronector – type locality for genus
 †Hypuronector limnaios – type locality for species
 †Hystrichosphaeridium
 †Hystrichosphaeridium armatum – or unidentified comparable form
 †Hystrichosphaeridium multicornutum – type locality for species
 †Hystrichosphaeridium raritanianum – type locality for species

I

  †Icarosaurus – type locality for genus
 †Icarosaurus siefkeri – type locality for species
 †Inaperturopollenites
 †Inaperturopollenites atlanticus – or unidentified comparable form
 †Inaperturopollenites tenuis – type locality for species
  †Inoceramus
 †Inoceramus proximus
 †Inoperna
 †Inoperna carolinensis
 †Ischyodus
 †Ischyodus bifurcatus
 †Ischyrhiza
 †Ischyrhiza mira
 †Ischyriza
 †Ischyriza mira
 †Izleiina
 †Izleiina spinitibialis – type locality for species

J

 †Jantarimantis – type locality for genus
 †Jantarimantis zherikhini – type locality for species
 †Jantaropterix
 †Jantaropterix newjersey – type locality for species
  †Jeletzkytes
 †Jeletzkytes criptonodosus
 †Jeletzkytes nodosus – or unidentified comparable form
 †Jeletzkytes plenus – or unidentified comparable form
 †Jersambromyia – type locality for genus
 †Jersambromyia borodini – type locality for species
 †Jersaphis – type locality for genus
 †Jersaphis luzzii – type locality for species
 †Jerseucoila – type locality for genus
 †Jerseucoila plesiosoma – type locality for species
 †Jerseyempheria – type locality for genus
 †Jerseyempheria grimaldii – type locality for species
 †Jerseyuloborus – type locality for genus
 †Jerseyuloborus longisoma – type locality for species
 †Jersiberotha – type locality for genus
 †Jersiberotha luzzii – type locality for species
 †Jersiberotha similis – type locality for species
 †Jersicoccus – type locality for genus
 †Jersicoccus kurthi – type locality for species
 †Jersimantis – type locality for genus
 †Jersimantis luzzii – type locality for species
 †Jersimantispa
 †Jersimantispa henryi – type locality for species
 Juliacorbula
 †Juliacorbula monmouthensis

K

 †Kitchinites
 †Klukisporites
 †Klukisporites variegatus
 †Koteya – type locality for genus
 †Koteya luzzii – type locality for species
  †Kouphichnium
 †Kyromyrma – type locality for genus
 †Kyromyrma neffi – type locality for species

L

 †Labiococcus – type locality for genus
 †Labiococcus joosti – type locality for species
 †Lagonomegops
 †Lagonomegops americanus – type locality for species
 †Laornis – type locality for genus
 †Laornis edvardsianus – type locality for species
 Laternula
 †Laternula tenuis
 †Latiala
 †Latiala lobata
 †Legumen
 †Legumen apressus
 †Legumen concentricum
 †Legumen ellipticum
 †Legumen ellipticus
  †Leidyosuchus
 Leptoconops
 †Leptoconops copiosus – type locality for species
 †Leptoconops curvachelus – type locality for species
 †Leptosolen
 †Leptosolen biplicata
 †Leptosolen elongata
 †Lewyites
 †Lewyites oronensis
 †Liadopsylla
 †Liadopsylla hesperia – type locality for species
 †Liassocupes
 †Liassocupes parvus
 Lima
 †Lima pelagica
 †Lima whitfieldi
 Limatula
 †Limatula acutilineata
 †Limonia
 †Limonia dillonae – type locality for species
 Limopsis
 †Linearea
 †Linearea metastriata
 †Linearis
 †Linearis contracta
 †Linearis metastriata
  Linuparus
  †Liodon
 †Liodon validus – type locality for species
 †Liopistha
 †Liopistha protexta
  †Lissodus
 Lithophaga
 †Lithophaga smocki
 †Longitubus
 †Longitubus lineatus
  Lopha
 †Lopha falcata
 †Lopha mesenterica
 †Loreisomorpha – type locality for genus
 †Loreisomorpha nascimbenei – type locality for species
  Lunatia
 †Lunatia paludiformis
 †Lycopodiacidites
 †Lycopodiacidites baculatus
 †Lycopodiumsporites
 †Lycopodiumsporites cerniidites
 †Lycopodiumsporites clavatoides
 †Lyriochlamys
 †Lyriochlamys whitfieldi
 Lytoloma
 †Lytoloma jeanesii – type locality for species

M

 †Mabelia – type locality for genus
 †Mabelia archaia – type locality for species
 †Mabelia connatifila – type locality for species
 †Machaerosaurus – or unidentified comparable form
 Malletia
 †Malletia littlei
 †Malletia stephensoni
 †Mantispidiptera – type locality for genus
 †Mantispidiptera enigmatica – type locality for species
 †Margaritella
 †Margaritella pumila
 Martesia
 †Martesia cretacea magnatuba
 †Matonisporites
 †Matonisporites globosus – type locality for species
  †Megalocoelacanthus
 †Megalocoelacanthus dobiei
 †Meleagrinella
 †Meleagrinella abrupta
 †Menabites
 †Menabites delawareneis
 †Menabites delawarensis
 †Menabites vanuxemi
 †Menabites walnutensis
  †Menuites
 †Menuites complexus
 †Mesotachyporus – type locality for genus
 †Mesotachyporus puer – type locality for species
 †Metoicoceras
 †Metoicoceras bergquisti
 †Metopina
 †Metopina goeleti – type locality for species
 †Micrabacia
 †Microaltingia – type locality for genus
 †Microaltingia apocarpela – type locality for species
 †Milnesium
 †Milnesium swolenskyi – type locality for species
 †Minyorussus – type locality for genus
 †Minyorussus luzzii – type locality for species
 †Miocardiopsis
  †Modiolus
 †Modiolus juliae
 †Modiolus sedesclaris
 †Modiolus sedesclarus
 †Monosulcites
 †Monosulcites scaber – type locality for species
 †Morea
 †Morea marylandica
  †Mosasaurus
 †Mosasaurus conodon – type locality for species
 †Mosasaurus dekayi – type locality for species
 †Mosasaurus dekayii – type locality for species
 †Mosasaurus maximus – type locality for species
  †Mytilus – tentative report
 †Mytilus planus

N

 †Napulus
 †Napulus octoliratus
 †Nascimberotha – type locality for genus
 †Nascimberotha picta – type locality for species
 †Naviculaformipites – type locality for genus
 †Naviculaformipites atlanticus – type locality for species
 †Naviculaformipites psilatus – type locality for species
 †Nedocosia
 †Nedocosia novacaesarea – type locality for species
 †Neithea
 †Neithea quinquecostata
 †Nemedromia
 †Nemedromia turonia – type locality for species
 †Nemocardium
 †Nemodon
 †Nemodon eufalensis
 †Nemodon eufaulensis
 †Nemodon stantoni
 †Neoturonius – type locality for genus
 †Neoturonius asymmetrus – type locality for species
 †Neoturonius cretatus – type locality for species
 †Neoturonius vetus – type locality for species
 †Newjersevania – type locality for genus
 †Newjersevania casei – type locality for species
 †Newjersevania nascimbenei – type locality for species
  †Nostoceras
 †Nostoceras alternatum
 †Nostoceras appoximans
 †Nostoceras helicinus
 †Nostoceras hyatti
 †Nostoceras mendryki
 †Nostoceras pauper
 †Novajerseya – type locality for genus
 †Novajerseya glesumica – type locality for species
   Nucula
 †Nucula angulatum
 †Nucula camia
 †Nucula cuneifrons
 †Nucula percrassa
 †Nucula protexta
 †Nucula slackiana
 †Nucula stephensoni
 †Nucula whitfieldi
 Nuculana
 †Nuculana longifrons
 †Nuculana protexta
 †Nuculana whitfieldi
 †Nuhliantha – type locality for genus
 †Nuhliantha nyanzaiana – type locality for species
 †Nymphalucina
 †Nymphalucina linearia

O

 †Odaxosaurus – or unidentified comparable form
  Odontaspis
 †Odontaspis aculeatus
 †Odontaspis samhammeri
 †Odontofusus
 †Odontofusus mucronata
 Oecobius – tentative report
 †Oligoptycha
 Oncopareia – or unidentified comparable form
 †Oodnadattia
 †Oodnadattia cooksonii – type locality for species
 †Oolopygus
 †Oolopygus williamsi
 †Opertochasma
  †Ophiomorpha
 †Ophiomorpha nodosa
 Orchestina
 †Osmundacidites
 †Osmundacidites wellmanii – or unidentified comparable form
 †Osteopleurus
 †Osteopleurus newarki
 †Osteopygis – type locality for genus
 †Osteopygis borealis – type locality for species
 †Osteopygis emarginatus – type locality for species
 †Osteopygis erosus – type locality for species
 †Osteopygis platylomus – type locality for species
 †Osteopygis robustus – type locality for species
  Ostrea
 †Ostrea denticulifera
 †Ostrea subspatulata
 †Oxyrhina
 †Oxyrhina desorii

P

  †Pachydiscus
 †Pachydiscus mokotibensis
 †Pachydiscus neubergicus
  Pagurus
 †Paladmete
 †Paladmete cancellaria
 †Paladmete laevis
 †Palaeagapetus
 †Palaeagapetus furcilla – type locality for species
 †Palaeobrachypogon
 †Palaeobrachypogon grandiforceps – type locality for species
 †Palaeobrachypogon remmi
 †Palaeometropus – type locality for genus
 †Palaeometropus cassus – type locality for species
  †Palaeoniscus
 †Palaeoniscus agassizii
 †Palaeoniscus fultus
 †Palaeoniscus latus
 †Palaeopagurus – tentative report
 †Palaeosegestria – type locality for genus
 †Palaeosegestria lutzzii – type locality for species
 †Palaeotringa – type locality for genus
 †Palaeotringa littoralis – type locality for species
 †Palaeotringa vagans – type locality for species
 †Paleoenkianthus – type locality for genus
 †Paleoenkianthus sayrevillensis – type locality for species
 †Paleofusimitra
 Panopea
 †Panopea deciea
 †Panopea decisa
 †Panopea descisa
 †Paracupes
 †Paracupes svitkoi – type locality for species
 †Paracyathus – tentative report
 †Paracyathus vaughani
 †Paralbula
 †Paralbula casei
 †Paranomia
 †Paranomia scabra
 †Paranomotodon
 †Paranomotodon angustidens
 †Pariostegeus
 †Parmicorbula
 †Parmicorbula percompressa
 †Parmicorbula torta
 †Parrisia – type locality for genus
 †Parrisia neocesariensis – type locality for species
 †Parvisaccites
 †Parvisaccites sphaericorpus – type locality for species
  †Pecten
 †Pecten quinquecostata
 †Pecten quinquenarius
 †Pecten simplicius
 †Pecten venustus
 †Pecten whitfieldi
 †Perforissus – type locality for genus
 †Perforissus muiri – type locality for species
 †Periplomya
 †Periplomya jerseyana
 †Peritresius
 †Peritresius ornatus
 †Perrisonota
 †Perrisonota littlei
 †Perrisonota protexta
 †Perseanthus – type locality for genus
 †Perseanthus crossmanensis – type locality for species
 Phacoides
 †Phacoides mattiformis
 †Phloeocharis
 †Phloeocharis agerata – type locality for species
  Pholadomya
 †Pholadomya occidentalis
 †Pholadomya roemeri
  Pholas
 †Phylocentropus – type locality for genus
 †Phylocentropus cretaceous – type locality for species
 †Phylocentropus gelhausi – type locality for species
 †Phylocentropus swolenskyi – type locality for species
 †Piceaepollenites
 †Piceaepollenites alatus
 †Piceaepollenites subconcinnus – type locality for species
 †Pilosisporites
 †Pilosisporites papilloides – type locality for species
  †Pinna
 †Pinna laqueata
 †Pinna loqueata
 †Pinuspollenites
 †Pinuspollenites granulatus – type locality for species
 †Pinuspollenites megasaccus – type locality for species
  †Placenticeras
 †Placenticeras placenta
 †Placenticeras syrtale – tentative report
 †Plagiostoma
 †Plagiostoma erecta
 †Platacodon – or unidentified comparable form
 †Platysaccus
 †Platysaccus radiatus – type locality for species
 †Plesiosaurus
 †Plesiosaurus brevifemur – type locality for species
 †Pleuriocardia
 †Pleuriocardia eufalensis
 †Pleuriocardia wenonah
 †Plicatolamna
 †Plicatolamna arcuata
 Plicatula
 †Plicatula howelli
 †Plicatula mullicaensis
 †Plicatula urticosa
  †Plioplatecarpus
 †Plioplatecarpus depressus – type locality for species
   †Plumalexius – type locality for genus
 †Plumalexius rasnitsyni – type locality for species
 †Podocarpidites
 †Podocarpidites ellipticus
  Polinices
 †Postligata
 †Postligata wordeni
 †Postopsyllidium – type locality for genus
 †Postopsyllidium emilyae – type locality for species
 †Praeleda
 †Praeleda compar
 †Prionochelys
 †Prionochelys nauta
 †Prioriphora
 †Prioriphora casei – type locality for species
 †Prioriphora luzzii – type locality for species
   †Pristis
 †Pristis curvidens
 †Procolophonichnium
 †Procolpochelys
 †Procolpochelys grandaeva
   †Prognathodon
 †Prognathodon rapax – type locality for species
 †Prognathodon sectorius – type locality for species
 †Proratites – type locality for genus
 †Proratites simplex – type locality for species
 †Protalphadon
 †Protalphadon lulli
 †Proteacidites
 †Proteacidites rectilatus – type locality for species
 †Protocallianassa
 †Protocallianassa mortoni
 †Protocallianassa praecepta
 †Protocardia
 †Protocardia spillmani
 †Protoculicoides
 †Protoculicoides globosus
 †Protoculicoides incompletus
 †Protoplatyrhina
 †Protoplatyrhina renae
 †Protorhyssalus – type locality for genus
 †Protorhyssalus goldmani – type locality for species
 †Prototeius – type locality for genus
 †Prototeius stageri – type locality for species
  †Pseudocorax
 †Pseudocorax granti
 †Pseudocuphosis – type locality for genus
 †Pseudocuphosis tristis – type locality for species
 †Pseudodontaspis
 †Pseudodontaspis herbsti – or unidentified comparable form
 †Pseudohypolophus
 †Pseudolimea
 †Pseudolimea reticulata
 †Pseudophyllites
 †Pseudophyllites indra
 †Psolimena – type locality for genus
 †Psolimena electra – type locality for species
  †Pteria
 †Pteria navicula
 †Pteria petrosa
 †Pteria rhombica
  †Pterotrigonia
 †Pterotrigonia angulicostata
 †Pterotrigonia cerulea
 †Pterotrigonia eufalensis
 †Pterotrigonia eufaulensis
 †Pterotrigonia kummeli
 †Ptychotrygon
 †Ptychotrygon hooveri
 †Ptychotrygon vermiculata
  Pycnodonte
 †Pycnodonte convexa
 †Pycnodonte mutabilis
 †Pycnodonte vesiculare
 †Pycnodonte vesicularis
 †Pyrifusus
 †Pyrifusus macfarlandi
 †Pyrifusus meeki
 †Pyropsis
 †Pyropsis planimarginata
 †Pyropsis trochiformis

R

 †Radiopecten
 †Radiopecten mississippiensis
 †Radiopecten quinquenarius
 †Radiopecten tenuitestus
 Rangia – tentative report
 †Rangia tenuidens
 †Rasnitsynapus – type locality for genus
 †Rasnitsynapus primigenius – type locality for species
 †Remnita
 †Remnita biacuminata – or unidentified comparable form
 †Rhachibermissa – type locality for genus
 †Rhachibermissa phenax – type locality for species
 †Rhachibermissa splendida – type locality for species
 †Rhetechelys
 †Rhetechelys platyops – type locality for species
  Rhinobatos
 †Rhinobatos casieri
  †Rhombodus
 †Rhombodus binkhorsti
 †Rhombodus laevis
 †Rhynchosauroides
 †Rhynchosauroides brunswickii
 †Rhynchosauroides hyperbates – type locality for species
  Ringicula
 †Ringicula clarki
 †Rostellites
 †Rostellites nasutus
 †Rostellites texturatus
 †Rouseisporites
 †Rouseisporites laevigatus
 †Rugubivesiculites
 †Rugubivesiculites multiplex
  †Rutiodon
 †Rutiodon carolinensis
 †Rutiodon manhattanensis – type locality for species

S

 †Sabalpollenites
 †Sabalpollenites dividuus – type locality for species
 †Sargana
 †Sauropus
 †Sauropus ingens – type locality for species
 †Sayrevilleus – type locality for genus
 †Sayrevilleus grimaldii – type locality for species
  †Scapanorhynchus
 †Scapanorhynchus texanus
  †Scaphites
 †Scaphites hippocrepis
 †Scaphites iris
 †Schizosporis
 †Schizosporis parvus
 †Schizosporis reticulatus
 †Sclerorhynchus
 †Sclerorhynchus pettersi
 †Scoyenia
 Segestria – tentative report
  †Semionotus
 †Semionotus brauni
 †Serphites
 †Serphites navesinkae – type locality for species
 †Serphites raritanensis – type locality for species
 Serpula
 †Serpula pervermiformis
  †Serratolamna
 †Serratolamna serrata
 †Solicoccus – type locality for genus
 †Solicoccus nascimbenei – type locality for species
 †Solyma
 †Solyma elliptica
 †Solyma lineolatus
 †Spathopria – type locality for genus
 †Spathopria sayrevillensis – type locality for species
 †Sphagnumsporites
 †Sphagnumsporites australis – or unidentified comparable form
 †Sphagnumsporites clavus
 †Sphagnumsporites psilatus
   †Sphecomyrma – type locality for genus
 †Sphecomyrma freyi – type locality for species
 †Sphecomyrma mesaki – type locality for species
  †Sphenodiscus
 †Sphenodiscus lobatus
  Spondylus
 †Spondylus echinata
 †Spondylus gregalis
  Squalicorax
 †Squalicorax kaupi
 †Squalicorax pristodontis
 †Squalicorax pristodontus
 Squatina
 †Squatina hassei
 †Stantonella
 †Stegobium
 †Stegobium raritanensis – type locality for species
 †Stegomus
 †Stegomus arcuatus
 †Steingelia
 †Steingelia cretacea – type locality for species
 †Stephandous
 †Stephanodus
 †Steropoides
 †Steropoides ingens
 †Stilobezzia
 †Stilobezzia kurthi – type locality for species
 †Stolamissus – type locality for genus
 †Stolamissus mirabilis – type locality for species
 Striarca
 †Striarca congesta
 †Striarca saffordi
 †Striaticostatum
 †Striaticostatum sparsum
 †Symmorphus – tentative report
 †Symmorphus senex – type locality for species
 †Syncyclonema
 †Syncyclonema conradi
 †Syncyclonema simplicius
 †Syneucoila – type locality for genus
 †Syneucoila magnifica – type locality for species
 †Synodontaspis
 †Synodontaspis hardingi
 †Synodontaspis holmdelensis
 †Synorichthys
 †Synorichthys stewarti – or unidentified comparable form

T

 †Tagsmiphron – type locality for genus
 †Tagsmiphron ascalaphus – type locality for species
 †Tagsmiphron gigas – type locality for species
 †Tagsmiphron muesebecki – type locality for species
 †Tanytrachelos
 †Tanytrachelos ahynis
 †Taphrosaurus
 †Taphrosaurus lockwoodi
 †Taphrosphys
 †Taphrosphys nodosus – type locality for species
 †Taphrosphys strenuus – type locality for species
 †Taphrosphys sulcatus – type locality for species
  Tellina
 †Tellina eborea
 †Tellinimera
 †Tellinimera buboana
 †Tellinimera eborea
 †Tellinimera gabbi
 †Telmatornis – type locality for genus
 †Telmatornis priscus – type locality for species
  Tenagodus
 †Tenagodus biplicata
 †Tenea
 †Tenea parilis
 †Tenea pinguis
 †Terabratulina
 †Terabratulina cooperi
 †Tethepomyia – type locality for genus
 †Tethepomyia thauma – type locality for species
 †Tetracarcinus
 †Tetracarcinus subquadratus
  †Thoracosaurus
 †Thoracosaurus glyptodon – type locality for species
 †Thoracosaurus neocesariensis – type locality for species
 †Todisporites
 †Todisporites major
 †Todisporites minor
  †Tomodon – type locality for genus
 †Tomodon horrificus – type locality for species
  Trachycardium
 †Trachycardium eufaulensis
 †Trachycardium longstreeti
 †Trachycardium multiradiatum
 †Trachycardium tenuistriatum
 †Trachyscaphites
 †Trachyscaphites pulcherrimus
 †Trachytriletes
 †Trachytriletes ancoraeformis – or unidentified comparable form
 †Tricolpites
 †Tricolpites balmei – type locality for species
 †Tricolpites heusseri – type locality for species
 †Tricolpites reticulatus – or unidentified comparable form
 †Tricolpites wilsonii – type locality for species
 †Trigonarca
 †Trigonarca cuneiformis
  †Trigonia
 †Trigonia cerulia
 †Trigonia enfaulensis
 †Trigonia mortoni
 †Triletes
 Trionyx
 †Trionyx halophilus
 †Trochoceramus
 †Trochoceramus proobliqua
 Trochocyathus
 †Trochocyathus balanophylloides
  Turbinella
 †Turbinella intermedia
 †Turbinopsis
 †Turbinopsis curta
 Turbonilla
 †Turbonilla laqueata
 †Turonempis – type locality for genus
 †Turonempis styx – type locality for species
 †Turonicoccus – type locality for genus
 †Turonicoccus beardsleyi – type locality for species
 †Turonicoccus grimaldii – type locality for species
  Turritella
 †Turritella bakeri
 †Turritella bilira
 †Turritella encrinoidea
 †Turritella encrinoides
 †Turritella hardemanensis
 †Turritella jerseyensis
 †Turritella marshalltownensis
 †Turritella merchantvillensis
 †Turritella trilira
 †Turritella vertebroides
 †Turseodus

U

 †Ulmipollenites
 †Ulmipollenites undulosus – or unidentified comparable form
 †Umbonicardium
 †Umbonicardium umbonatum
 †Unicardium
 †Urceolabrum
 †Urceolabrum tuberculatum

V

 †Veniella
 †Veniella conradi
 †Veniella elevata
 †Veniella trapezoidea
 †Vetericardiella
 †Vetericardiella crenalirata
 †Vianagramma – type locality for genus
 †Vianagramma goldmani – type locality for species
 †Vianathauma – type locality for genus
 †Vianathauma pericarti – type locality for species
 †Volutoderma
 †Volutoderma biplicata
 †Volutomorpha
 †Volutomorpha conradi
 †Volutomorpha ponderosa
  †Volviceramus
 †Volviceramus involutus
 Vulsella – or unidentified comparable form
 †Vulsella monmouthensis

W

 †Wilsonisporites – type locality for genus
 †Wilsonisporites woodbridgei – type locality for species
 †Wormaldia
 †Wormaldia praecursor – type locality for species

X

 Xanthosia
 †Xanthosia elegans
 †Xenosycorax – type locality for genus
 †Xenosycorax engeli – type locality for species
 †Xenotrichomyia – type locality for genus
 †Xenotrichomyia newjerseyiensis – type locality for species
  †Xiphactinus
 †Xiphactinus audax
 †Xiphactinus vetus

References

 

Mesozoic
New Jersey-related lists
New Jersey